The 2nd Reserve Officers' Training Corps Brigade is an Army Reserve Officers' Training Corps brigade based at Fort Dix, New Jersey.

2nd Brigade (ROTC) Host Programs

Massachusetts 
 Boston University
 Massachusetts Institute of Technology
 Northeastern University
 University of Massachusetts Amherst
 Worcester Polytechnic Institute

Connecticut 
 University of Connecticut

Maine 
 University of Maine

New Hampshire 
 University of New Hampshire

New Jersey 
 Princeton University
 Rutgers University
 Seton Hall University

New York 
 Canisius College
 City University of New York
 Clarkson University
 Cornell University
 Fordham University
 Hofstra University
 Niagara University
 Rochester Institute of Technology
 SUNY Brockport
 Saint Bonaventure University
 Saint John's University, New York
 Siena College
 Syracuse University
 Stony Brook University

Pennsylvania 
 Bucknell University
 Dickinson College
 Drexel University
 Edinboro University of Pennsylvania
 Gannon University
 Indiana University of Pennsylvania
 Lehigh University
 Lock Haven University of Pennsylvania
 Pennsylvania State University
 Shippensburg University
 Slippery Rock University
 Temple University
 University of Pittsburgh
 University of Scranton
 Widener University

Rhode Island 
 Providence College
 University of Rhode Island

Vermont 
 University of Vermont

References

Reserve Officers' Training Corps